Terry Mark Dion (born November 22, 1957) is a former American football defensive end in the National Football League (NFL) who played for the Seattle Seahawks. He played college football at University of Oregon. He now resides in Aberdeen Washington, and teaches at Aberdeen High School.

References 

Living people

1957 births
American football defensive ends
Oregon Ducks football players
Seattle Seahawks players